Barsegh is an Armenian given name. Parsegh is an alternative in Western Armenian.

Barsegh and Parsegh may refer to:

Religious leaders
Parsegh of Cilicia, Armenian Catholicos of Cilicia from 1105 to 1113
Barsegh or Basil the Doctor (fl. 1146), poet and chaplain of Baldwin of Marash
Parsegh, Armenian Patriarch of Jerusalem (1341–1356)
Parsegh Petros IV Avkadian, known as Basile Petros IV Avkadian, Armenian Catholic Patriarch from 1780 to 1788

Others
Barsegh Kanachyan or Parsegh Ganatchian (1885–1967), Lebanese-Armenian composer and conductor
Barsegh Kirakosyan (born 1982), Russian-born Armenian football player
Parsegh Shahbaz (1883–1915), Ottoman Armenian lawyer, political activist, journalist, and columnist

Armenian masculine given names